Latifî (1491–1582), or Kastamonulu Latifî Çelebi, was an Ottoman poet and bibliographer. Born in Kastamonu, in northern Anatolia, he became famous for his tezkire Tezkiretü'ş-Şuara (Memoirs of the Poets), the second Ottoman collection of bibliographical data on poets and poetry in overall.

Latifî was born Abdüllatif Hatibzâde into a notable family in Kastamonu and was educated there. He worked as accountant and katib (secretary) in various vakifs (pious foundation), including Belgrade, Constantinople, Rhodes, and Egypt.
His major work was Tezkiretü'ş-Şuara (Memoirs of the Poets), which was the second tezkire in chronological order after that of Sehi Bey. It is also the one with most extent copies, 91 in total. The tezkire was organized in three sections with an introduction. It narrated the life and work of around 300 poets of the period from the reign of Murad II (reigned between 1421-1451) until 1543, and was finished and presented it to Sultan Suleiman the Magnificent in 1546. The Sultan was so pleased that he appointed Latifi as secretary at the "Ayyub al-Ansari" complex endowment. According to Aşık Çelebi's work Senses of Poets (Meşairü'ş-Şuara), the poet wrote it mostly during the era of Suleiman, but presented it to Murad III in 1574 after making minor changes to the introduction.
Another important work of him was Evsaf-ı İstanbul (Qualities of Istanbul) written in 1525. It gives a historical overview on the city of Istanbul, intertwined with geographical data, and information on the city's neighborhoods, architecture, and social life.

Latifi spent the last years of his life in Istanbul. He died by drowning when the ship he was traveling to Yemen sank in the Red Sea.

See also 
Ahdi of Baghdad
Diwan poetry

References

Divan poets from the Ottoman Empire
People from Kastamonu
1491 births
1582 deaths
15th-century people from the Ottoman Empire
16th-century poets from the Ottoman Empire
Deaths due to shipwreck at sea
Civil servants from the Ottoman Empire
Turkish-language poets